This is a list of summer schools of nature science.

 Finland: The 19th Jyväskylä Summer School – Jyväskylä (2009)
 Italy: The NKS Summer School 2009 – Pisa (2009)
 India: SAGE Summer School e Learning -

See also

 Lists of schools

References

Nature science

Nature science